The Day Called 'X' is a dramatized CBS documentary film set in Portland, Oregon, in which the entire city is evacuated in anticipation of a nuclear air raid, after Soviet bombers had been detected by radar stations to the north; it details the activation of the city's civil defense protocols and leads up to the moment before the attack (the ending is left intentionally unknown). The operations were run from the Kelly Butte Bunker, which was the emergency operations center at that time. It was filmed in September 1957 and aired December 8 of that year. Apart from presenter/narrator Glenn Ford, none of the people shown are actors. They are locals of Portland shown in their real jobs, including Mayor Terry Schrunk.

Its local re-broadcast in 2004 and appearance in the on-line Prelinger Archives attracted interest among local history buffs due to its extensive outside shots of the city, and the use of non-actor participants (local officials and broadcasters). Whenever one of these individuals is heard uttering warnings or statements regarding attack, the words "AN ATTACK IS NOT TAKING PLACE" are superimposed over the picture.

On September 27, 1955, Portland actually conducted an exercise evacuation of downtown called "Operation Greenlight", and the film is often misattributed to that year. Ford's narration, however, does make direct reference to the 1955 exercise.

See also
 
 CRP-2B

References

External links
 
 A Day Called X (part 1) at the Prelinger Archive
 A Day Called X (part 2) at the Prelinger Archive
 

1957 television films
1957 films
American documentary television films
Cold War films
Culture of Portland, Oregon
Films set in Oregon
Films shot in Portland, Oregon
1957 documentary films
CBS network films
Documentary films about nuclear war and weapons
1950s American films